"Runaway" is the only single taken from British acid jazz band Jamiroquai's greatest hits compilation, High Times: Singles 1992–2006. The single was released on 30 October 2006. It was their fifth #1 on the U.S. Dance Chart and peaked at #18 on the UK Singles Chart.

Background
The song's lyrics relate to dispute involving group's record label, Sony BMG, who wanted to cut ties with the band six records into an eight-record deal. Jay Kay confirmed this, following a performance of the song in London's Jazz Cafe in August 2008. 

The single peaked at #18 on the UK Singles Chart.

Music video

The video was filmed in London and it has two sections. The first features Jay Kay dancing and singing in his home studio; the second shows a man, later revealed to be Kay, wearing a space suit driving a dune buggy through London with an astronaut suit. The video ends where it starts, with the astronaut exiting at the subway station, the Piccadilly Circus tube station.

Track listing
 UK CD1
 "Runaway" – 3:44
 "Runaway (Tom Belton Remix Edit)" – 3:30

 UK CD2
 "Runaway" – 3:44
 "Runaway (Tom Belton Remix)" – 7:11
 "Runaway (Grant Nelson Remix)" – 6:10
 "Runaway (Alan Braxe & Fred Falke Remix)" – 6:37

Remixes
Alan Braxe & Fred Falke Mixes
 "Runaway (Alan Braxe & Fred Falke Remix)" – 6:38
 "Runaway (Alan Braxe & Fred Falke Dub)" – 5:52
Grant Nelson Mixes
 "Runaway (Grant Nelson Remix)" – 6:10
 "Runaway (Grant Nelson Dub)" – 6:10
Tom Belton Mixes
 "Runaway (Tom Belton Vocal Mix)" – 7:14
 "Runaway (Tom Belton Dub)" – 7:16
 "Runaway (Tom Belton Remix Edit)" – 3:30

Charts

Weekly charts

Year-end charts

References

2006 singles
Jamiroquai songs
Songs written by Jason Kay
Songs written by Matt Johnson (keyboardist)
Columbia Records singles
2006 songs
Disco songs